Kingsmead is a residential development and civil parish in the Cheshire West and Chester district, Cheshire, England, located on the eastern bank of the River Weaver. South of Northwich and west of Leftwich, the development is a greenfield site and was constructed by Redrow to hold a population of 5,000 people as a suburb of Northwich. The parish was created on 1 April 2011 from parts of Davenham and Northwich. It has a post code starting with CW9.

References 

Villages in Cheshire
Civil parishes in Cheshire
Cheshire West and Chester